Battle of the Seven Sisters (lit. Seven Princesses) is a 2021 comedy, family and romance drama series produced by TVB. The series stars Priscilla Wong, Rosina Lam and Samantha Ko as the main leads.  The producer is Chan Wai-kwun.

This drama won the Best Drama award and Rosina Lam won the Best Actress award with this drama at the 2021 TVB Anniversary Awards. However, this stirred up controversies among netizens and audience in both Hong Kong and mainland China.

Production
The shooting lasted from May to September 2020. A costume fitting press conference was held on 14 May 2020.

Synopsis
The drama series is about seven women of different ages completing missions assigned by their deceased father to obtain his legacy and to reconcile with their family.

Cast and Character

Koo Family

Other Cast
Gilbert Lam as Matthew Szeto But (司徒北), Solicitor and Jasmine's mentor. Koo Bak-fong's good friend who was charge of carrying out his will after his death. He was adopted by the Koo family as their "eldest brother" in episode 26.
Timothy Cheng as Philip Sum Chiu-yin (沈昭然), Grace's supervisor who has a crush on her. He was an expert in fencing.
Tsui Wing as Gordon Wong Nam (王男), a street artist who looked identical to Grace's deceased husband.
Felix Ng as Aden Cheung Man-ho (張文豪), a physiotherapist who was interested in fencing and joined the same fencing club as Jasmine. He was Alison's former student and has a crush on her.
Luk Wing as Hanson Ma (馬崎駿), nicknamed "Fifteenth Young Master (十五少)", an aspiring comic book artist who becomes friends with Ching.  He has four older sisters who run a burger restaurant.
Moon Lau as Maya Cheuk Mei-nga (卓美雅), a model in Korea and Sung Wan-kei's best friend until she later falsely accused him of rape. (Introduced in Ep. 21)
Hera Chan as Miss Y (胡映雪), a victim of a sexual assault case which Alison lost as the prosecutor. (Ep. 8-10)

Guest Appearance 
Ben Wong as Barrister Fan (范大狀).
Joel Chan as Duncan Yip Chi-lai (葉子禮), Alison's university classmate with whom he had an affair.
Katy Kung as Josephine Kam Sin-yan (金倩欣), Duncan’s wife.

References

Chinese comedy-drama television series